Multilinear may refer to:

 Multilinear form, a type of mathematical function from a vector space to the underlying field
 Multilinear map, a type of mathematical function between vector spaces
 Multilinear algebra, a field of mathematics